The Broadcasting Complaints Commission of South Africa (BCCSA) is a string complaints authority established by the National Association of Broadcasters (NAB) to enforce a Code of Conduct for television and radio broadcasts in South Africa. The Commission receives complaints from the public about offensive broadcasts and has the power to reprimand or fine broadcasters and to require the broadcast of a correction or apology. The BCCSA is independent of the NAB and of government, although it is funded by the NAB and recognised by ICASA as an independent disciplinary tribunal.

See also 
 Independent Communications Authority of South Africa

References

External links 
 

Broadcasting in South Africa
Mass media complaints authorities
Consumer organisations in South Africa
Regulation in South Africa